The Bank of Osceola is a historic bank building at 207 East Hale Street in Osceola, Arkansas.  It is a two-story brick structure, built in 1909 during Osceola's major building boom. Decorative brick and stone elements on its facade include a cornice between the two floors, with a scalloped effect.  This band once included panels said to depict the Native American chief Osceola; these are now on a building at the local high school.  The building housed a bank and grocery store when opened, with law and real-estate offices above. The decorative elements inside include elaborate woodwork and mosaic-tile floors.

The building was listed on the National Register of Historic Places in 1987.

See also
National Register of Historic Places listings in Mississippi County, Arkansas

References

Bank buildings on the National Register of Historic Places in Arkansas
Commercial buildings completed in 1909
Osceola, Arkansas
National Register of Historic Places in Mississippi County, Arkansas
Individually listed contributing properties to historic districts on the National Register in Arkansas
1909 establishments in Arkansas